This list of bridges in Portugal lists bridges of particular historical, scenic, architectural or engineering interest. Road and railway bridges, viaducts, aqueducts and footbridges are included.

Historical and architectural interest bridges

Major road and railway bridges 
This table presents the structures with spans greater than 100 meters (non-exhaustive list).

List of bridges by region

Alentejo

Algarve

Centro

Lisboa

Norte

Madeira

Notes and references 
 Notes

  - Sistema de Informação para o Património Arquitectónico, Ministério da Cultura

 

 Others references

See also 

 :pt:Lista de pontes históricas do Alentejo  - List of historic bridges in Alentejo
 Transport in Portugal
 Roads in Portugal
 List of highways in Portugal
 Rail transport in Portugal
 Geography of Portugal

External links

Further reading 
 
 

Portugal
 
Bridges
Bridges